Burntside Lake is a  lake, located  northwest of Ely, Minnesota, in Saint Louis County, Minnesota.  Its western boundary adjoins the Boundary Waters Canoe Area Wilderness on Tamarack Creek.

Native fish include Bluegill, Golden Shiner, Green Sunfish, Lake Trout, Lake Whitefish, Northern Pike, Rainbow Smelt, Rock Bass, Shorthead Redhorse, Smallmouth Bass, Walleye, White Sucker and Yellow Perch.

On its shores are two historic resorts with original hand-scribed log cabins, both built in the early 1900s and operating continuously since then: Burntside Lodge (1913)  and Camp  Van Vac (1918). The YMCA's Camp Widjiwagan is also located on the lake's shore.

Burntside Lake's more than 100 islands include   
Beach;
Bear;
Berry; Blueberry;
Brownell;
Burnt;
Burntside Islands;
Gem;
Dollar; 
Evans; 
Good Dog;
Half Dollar; 
Honeymoon; 
Indian;
Lockhart;
Long;
Lost Girl; 
Miller; 
Oliver;
Picnic;
Porkchop;
Ripple;
Snake; 
State; 
Sumpter; 
Waters; and many more.

Long Island was recently acquired by the Trust for Public Land.

The Burntside Islands (Snellman and Pine) are SNAs (Scientific and Natural Areas, gifted by the Nature Conservancy) held by the DNR.

References

Burntside Lake Association

Lakes of Minnesota
Lakes of St. Louis County, Minnesota
Tourist attractions in St. Louis County, Minnesota